Aschenbrenner is a German surname. A spelling variation is Ashabranner. Notable people with the surname include:
Carl Aschenbrenner (1865–1941), American physician and politician
Frank Aschenbrenner (1925–2012), American football player
Franz Aschenbrenner (born 1986), German motorcycle racer
George Aschenbrenner (1881–1952), US participant in the 1904 Summer Olympics
Karl Aschenbrenner (1911–1988), American philosopher, translator, and author
Matthias Aschenbrenner (born 1972), German mathematician
Peter J. Aschenbrenner (born 1945), American lawyer and historian
Rosa Aschenbrenner (1885–1967), German politician
Wilhelmine Aschenbrenner (1791 – after 1834), German actress

Ashabranner may refer to:
Brent Ashabranner (1921–2016), American Peace Corps administrator and children's literature writer

See also
Aschenbrener

German-language surnames
Occupational surnames